Thomas H. Worrilow (August 15, 1918 – August 29, 2004) was an American politician who served as a Republican member of the Pennsylvania House of Representatives, Delaware County district from 1963 to 1964 and the 159th district from 1967 to 1976.

Early life
Worrilow was born in Chester, Pennsylvania.  He served as a sergeant in the United States Army Corps of Engineers during World War II from 1942 to 1945 and received 3 overseas service bars, the Good Conduct Medal, on service strip and the European-African-Middle East Campaign Medal and 3 Bronze Star Medals.

Civilian career
Worrilow worked as a typesetter for the Delaware Valley Times for 45 years, an insurance agent, volunteer firefighter and President of Moyamensing Fire Company.

Political career
Worrilow served as an alderman in Chester from 1960 to 1966.  He was elected as a Republican to the Pennsylvania House of Representatives for the Delaware County district for the 1963 term.  He was an unsuccessful candidate for reelection in 1964.

In 1967, Pennsylvania created the 159th district and Worrilow was elected as representative and served 4 terms afterwards.  During his time as Pennsylvania State Representative, he lobbied for improvements to Pennsylvania Route 291.  He was an unsuccessful candidate for reelection in 1976 and was succeeded by Francis Tenaglio.

Worrilow died in Chester, Pennsylvania and is interred at the Lawn Croft cemetery in Linwood, Pennsylvania.

|

References

1918 births
2004 deaths
20th-century American politicians
United States Army personnel of World War II
Burials at Lawn Croft Cemetery
Republican Party members of the Pennsylvania House of Representatives
People from Chester, Pennsylvania